George Ray Thomas Jr. (born July 11, 1964) is a former American football wide receiver in the National Football League who played for the Atlanta Falcons and Tampa Bay Buccaneers. He played college football for the UNLV Rebels.

References

1964 births
Living people
American football wide receivers
Atlanta Falcons players
Tampa Bay Buccaneers players
UNLV Rebels football players